General Adolfo Sigwald (October 27, 1923 – March 25, 1999) was de facto Governor of Córdoba, Argentina from March 8, 1979, to January 20, 1982.

References

1923 births
1999 deaths
Governors of Córdoba Province, Argentina
Argentine generals
Argentine people of German descent
Place of birth missing